Guesalaga Island is the northern of two islands lying off the east side of Lecointe Island, in the Palmer Archipelago of Antarctica. It was named by the Chilean Antarctic Expedition of 1947 for its commander, Capitán de Navío Federico Guesalaga Toro.

See also 
 List of Antarctic and sub-Antarctic islands

References

Islands of the Palmer Archipelago